Somandepalle is a census town in Sri Sathya Sai district of the Indian state of Andhra Pradesh. It is located in Somandepalle mandal of Penukonda revenue division. The town is a constituent of Anantapur urban agglomeration.

Demographics 
According to Indian census, 2001, the demographic details of Somandepalle mandal is as follows:
 Total Population: 	40,219	in 8,426 Households
 Male Population: 	20,667	and Female Population: 	19,552
 Children Under 6-years of age: 5,901	(Boys – 2,960 and Girls – 2,941)
 Total Literates: 	17,271

Education 
The primary and secondary school education is imparted by government, aided and private schools, under the School Education Department of the state. The medium of instruction followed by different schools are English and Telugu.

See also 
List of census towns in Andhra Pradesh

References 

Census towns in Andhra Pradesh
Mandal headquarters in Sri Sathya Sai district
Cities and towns in Sri Sathya Sai district